Pantolambda (Greek: "all" (pantos), "lambda" (lambda), in a reference to the shape of upper premolars, similar to the Greek letter lambda) is an extinct genus of Paleocene pantodont mammal. Pantolambda lived during the middle Paleocene, and has been found both in Asia and North America.

Cretaceous mammals, which had to compete with dinosaurs, were generally small insect eaters. Pantolambda was one of the first mammals to expand into the large-animal niches left vacant by the extinction of the dinosaurs. Pantolambda and other early pantodonts would quickly evolve into heavy animals such as Barylambda and Coryphodon. These were the first large browsers, pioneering styles of life later followed by many unrelated groups of mammals: rhinos, tapirs, hippos, ground sloths, and elephants. Pantodonts such as Pantolambda were definitely not tree dwellers.

Description

Pantolambda was large for a Paleocene mammal, about the size of a sheep. A generalized early mammal, it had a vaguely cat-like body, heavy head, long tail and five-toed plantigrade feet ending in blunt nails that were neither hooves nor sharp claws. The foot bones articulated in a similar way to the feet of hoofed mammals, and the feet were probably not very flexible.

Teeth
The teeth had a selenodont structure; enamel ridges with crescent-shaped cusps. Selenodont teeth are found in modern grazers and browsers such as cattle and deer, but Pantolambda'''s teeth were low-crowned and indicate a not very specialized diet. Pantolambda probably ate a mix of shoots, leaves, fungi, and fruit, which it may have supplemented with occasional worms or eggs.

Discovery and species
 
Fossils of this genus have been found in these Torrejonian-Tiffanian formations at the following localities of the United States:
 Pantolambda bathmodon Sandoval County, New Mexico (paleocoordinates )
 Pantolambda cavirictum Park County, Wyoming
 San Juan County, New Mexico
 Sandoval County, New Mexico
 Carbon County, Wyoming
 Fremont County, Wyoming
 Pantolambda intermedium''
 Hot Springs/Washakie County, Wyoming
 San Juan County, New Mexico
 Sweet Grass County, Montana

References

Pantodonts
Paleocene mammals
Natural history of San Juan County, New Mexico
Paleocene mammals of Asia
Fossil taxa described in 1882
Prehistoric mammal genera